Eresinopsides bamptoni is a butterfly in the family Lycaenidae. It is found in south-eastern Tanzania. The habitat consists of lowland forests.

Adults have been recorded on wing in February and March.

References

Endemic fauna of Tanzania
Butterflies described in 2004
Poritiinae